Čifluk (Cyrillic: Чифлук) is a village in the municipality of Ilijaš, Sarajevo Canton, Bosnia and Herzegovina.

References

Populated places in Ilijaš